Zenny "Algodão" de Azevedo (1 March 1925 – 10 March 2001) was a Brazilian basketball player, who competed for his native country in four consecutive Summer Olympics, starting in 1948. Commonly known by the name of Algodão ("Cotton"), he won the bronze medal in 1948 and 1960 with the Brazilian basketball team. He was born in Rio de Janeiro.

References

External links
 Profile
 Profile

1925 births
2001 deaths
Basketball players from Rio de Janeiro (city)
Brazilian men's basketball players
1954 FIBA World Championship players
1959 FIBA World Championship players
Olympic basketball players of Brazil
Basketball players at the 1948 Summer Olympics
Basketball players at the 1951 Pan American Games
Basketball players at the 1952 Summer Olympics
Basketball players at the 1955 Pan American Games
Basketball players at the 1956 Summer Olympics
Basketball players at the 1959 Pan American Games
Basketball players at the 1960 Summer Olympics
Flamengo basketball players
Olympic bronze medalists for Brazil
Olympic medalists in basketball
Medalists at the 1960 Summer Olympics
Medalists at the 1948 Summer Olympics
Pan American Games bronze medalists for Brazil
Pan American Games medalists in basketball
FIBA World Championship-winning players
Medalists at the 1955 Pan American Games
1950 FIBA World Championship players